Glow is the third full-length EP by British DJ and electronic dance music composer Andy Hunter°. It is the follow-up to his 2010 EP Collide. Glow was released on 23 July 2012 on all digital retailers.

Track list

References

External links 
 Andy Hunter Official Website
 Andy Hunter on FaceBook

2012 albums
Andy Hunter (DJ) albums